Hao Peng (1881–1946) was a politician of the Republic of China. He belonged to the Beijing Government, later he became an important politician during the Wang Jingwei regime. His courtesy name was Yucang. He was born in Sanhe, Zhili (Hebei).

Life 
At the end of the Qing Dynasty, Hao Peng graduated from the Shandong High School. At first he entered the educational system in Fengtian, and successively held the positions of general supervisor of the elementary school and teacher of the preparatory school for studying abroad, manager of the junior high school. Then he turned to political circles, and successively held the positions of president of the Gazette Bureau of Hubei and leader of the Department of Agricultural Affairs of the public office for encouragement of industry, Shandong.

After the proclamation of the Republic of China, Hao Peng successively held the positions of public prosecutor of the Financial Ministry and chief of the General Affairs Agency. From December 1924 until January 1926 he worked as Chief of the Financial Agency of Zhili. Later he became a staff officer for Zhang Zongchang, and was appointed Governor of Anhui. In 1927 he retired from political activity for a while.

In October 1941 Hao Peng was appointed Member of the Commission for Rivers and Aqueducts in North China of the North China Political Council, the Wang Jingwei regime. In next January he was catapulted to Chief Executive of the Suhuai Special Region. In March of the same year he also held the position of commander of that Region's security forces. In September 1943 he was appointed Political Councilor of the Nanjing Nationalist Government (Wang's clique).

After the Second World War, Hao Peng was arrested, and finally died in Jinan.

References

Footnotes 
 
 

People from Langfang
Chinese collaborators with Imperial Japan
1881 births
Year of death uncertain